Wyoming Highway 412 (WYO 412), also known as the Carter–Lyman Road and previously as the Carter Cutoff Road,  is a  state highway in Uinta and Lincoln counties in western Wyoming, United States, that connects Interstate 80 (I-80/Dwight D. Eisenhower Highway), northwest of Lyman, with U.S. Route 189 (US 189), south of Kemmerer.

Route description
WYO 412 begins at a diamond interchange on Interstate 80 in northeastern Uinta County, northwest of Lyman. The route is a continuation of WYO 414, which proceeds southward through Urie and Mountain View.
 From I-80, WYO 412 proceeds in a northwestward direction, passing the Fort Bridger Airport.

History
WYO 410 was established in June 1971.

Major intersections

See also

 List of state highways in Wyoming

References

External links

 Wyoming State Routes 400-499
 US-189 to I-80/WYO 414

Transportation in Uinta County, Wyoming
Transportation in Lincoln County, Wyoming
412